Ingi Højsted (born 12 November 1985) is a retired Faroese football midfielder, who last played for B36 Tórshavn. He has been capped for the Faroe Islands at senior level.

Club career
In the summer of 2002 he joined Arsenal in London as a trainee, later playing for B36 Tórshavn. On 22 November 2005 Birmingham City signed him until the end of the season. 
Højsted has since parted company with Birmingham City after playing only 45 minutes of reserve team football.

His career's progression was curtailed by several short to long-term injuries, of which fostered him eventually retiring.

International career
Højsted made his debut for the Faroe Islands in an April 2003 friendly match against Kazakhstan, coming on as a substitute for Jákup á Borg. He has collected 6 caps and has scored no goals.

References

External links
 

1985 births
Living people
Faroese footballers
Faroe Islands international footballers
Faroese expatriate footballers
Arsenal F.C. players
Birmingham City F.C. players
B36 Tórshavn players
Association football midfielders
Expatriate footballers in England
People from Tórshavn